The Blohm & Voss BV 237 was a German proposed dive bomber with an unusual asymmetric design based on the Blohm & Voss BV 141.

Design and development
In 1942, the Luftwaffe was interested in replacing the venerable but ageing Junkers Ju 87, and Dr. Richard Vogt's design team at Blohm & Voss began work on project P 177.
The dive bomber version would have had a one-man crew with two fixed forward firing  MG 151 cannon and two rear firing  MG 131 machine guns, carrying  of bombs.

A two-seat ground attack version was also proposed with two fixed forward firing  MG 151 cannon, three forward firing  MK 103 cannon with six  bombs.

A final B-1 type was to incorporate a Junkers Jumo 004B turbojet engine in a third nacelle slung underneath the wing, between the piston engine and the cockpit.

In early 1943 the B&V design, now called the BV 237, was shown to Hitler and he ordered it into production. However the order was not carried out. In the summer, Allied bombing raids over Hamburg caused no damage to the Blohm and Voss facilities, but the Ministry of Aviation ordered all developmental work stopped. Work continued later and it was determined that construction could begin in mid 1945, but plans for a pre-production A-0 series were abandoned, leaving the project at the pre-production stage near the end of 1944, with only a wooden mock-up completed.

Variants
P.177: Original project which led to the BV 237.

BV 237 (single seat)A single seat Sturzkampfflugzeug (dive bomber) armed with two fixed forward firing  MG 151 cannon and two rear firing  MG 131 machine guns, carrying  of bombs.

BV 237 (2-seat)
A twin seater Schlachtflugzeug (ground attack) aircraft armed with two fixed forward firing  MG 151 cannon and three forward firing  MK 103 cannon, with six  bombs.

BV 237B-1
A proposed mixed-power version with a podded Junkers Jumo 004B underslung between the BMW 801 nacelle and the fuselage.

Specifications (BV 237)

See also
List of German aircraft projects, 1939–45

References

BV 237
Asymmetrical aircraft